Children Are Us Foundation is a charity for people with an intellectual disability in Taiwan. The goal for this organization is to inspire and promote the potential talent of people with intellectual disability or developmental disability. Children Are Us Foundation is a non-profit private organization (NPO) which provides long-term care and job training to people with Down syndrome, cerebral palsy, multiple dysfunction and other mental illnesses.  It works on changing people's general perception, hoping people can understand and respect people with intellectual disability, instead of making fun of them or looking down on them.  The principles of the organization are love, professionalism, and humanity. They advocate "self-support" of people with intellectual disability by providing adaptive technology and work opportunity so that they can live normal lives as others.

History
The organization was founded by parents of people with intellectual disability in Kaohsiung, Taiwan on 29 June 1995 as Children Are Us of Cultural and Educational Foundation. It was then recognized by the Ministry of the Interior in May 2006 and registered as Children Are Us Foundation for Social Welfare in October the same year.

Business
Children Are Us is famous in Taiwan for operating bakeries and restaurants that employ people with intellectual disabilities. The first Children Are Us bakery opened in Kaohsiung city in 1997, and the Foundation has since expanded, opening other branches in Taipei city and Hsinchu city. It has operated an Italian restaurant in Taipei where people with an intellectual disability are employed and a coffee shop at Taipei's City Hall. Controversially, the agency has been accused of paying its disabled employees below the minimum wage.

External links

References

Intellectual disability organizations
Medical and health organizations based in Taiwan
Organizations for children with health issues
Child-related organizations in Taiwan
Disability in Taiwan